Charlotte Scanlan (born 30 July 1988) is a New Zealand professional rugby league footballer. She previously played for the Newcastle Knights in the NRL Women's Premiership.

Background
Born in Wellington, New Zealand, Scanlan is of Samoan descent. She played her junior rugby league for the Richmond Roses.

Playing career

Early years
From the years 2007 to 2009, Scanlan played rugby union with Kia Toa RFC and Manawatu. In 2012, she played for the Richmond Roses and Akarana Falcons. She was selected in the Kiwi Ferns squad later that year. In 2013, she played for the Auckland NPC rugby union and rugby sevens sides. She then represented the Kiwi Ferns at the 2013 Women's Rugby League World Cup. In 2014, she was selected for the New Zealand women's sevens team to play at the 2014–15 World Rugby Women's Sevens Series, and was selected again in 2015. In 2016, she represented the Auckland Storm, Auckland women's sevens team and New Zealand women's sevens team again. In 2017, she moved to Japan to play rugby union and captained the Auckland women's sevens team. In 2020, she returned to the Kiwis Ferns squad. In December 2021, she signed with the Newcastle Knights to be a part of their inaugural NRLW squad.

2022
In Round 1 of the delayed 2021 NRL Women's season, Scanlan made her NRLW debut for the Knights against the Parramatta Eels. She played in 5 matches for the Knights, before parting ways with the club at the end of the season.

In October, she was selected for the New Zealand squad at the delayed 2021 Women's Rugby League World Cup in England.

References

External links
Newcastle Knights profile

1988 births
New Zealand female rugby league players
New Zealand sportspeople of Samoan descent
New Zealand women's national rugby league team players
Newcastle Knights (NRLW) players
Rugby league props
Rugby league locks
Rugby league second-rows
Living people
New Zealand female rugby sevens players
New Zealand women's international rugby sevens players